Welcome is a 1986 Soviet paint-on-glass-animated 10-minute film adapted from the 1948 children's book by Dr. Seuss Thidwick the Big-Hearted Moose. It is a coproduction of Sverdlovsk television studio and Gosteleradio.

Released in 1986, the film went on to win the Grand Prix at the Ottawa International Animation Festival in 1988 and in Los Angeles. Although the visual style is quite different, the story is mostly the same with the exception of some subtle changes — for example, the moose isn't shown rejoining his herd at the end and the squatter animals aren't stuffed and mounted. Also, none of the animals are ever named and there is no narrator. The film was directed by Alexei Karayev. The art director was Aleksandr Petrov, who would later win an Oscar for his 1999 film The Old Man and the Sea. The screenplay was written by Yury Iosifovich Koval, a renowned author.

References

External links
 
 Welcome at animator.ru
 

1986 films
Soviet animated short films
1980s animated short films
Paint-on-glass animated films
Films based on works by Dr. Seuss
Animated films based on children's books